Gidey is an Ethiopian surname. Notable people with the surname include:

Letesenbet Gidey (born 1998), Ethiopian long-distance runner
Tesfay Gidey Hailemichael, Ethiopian National Defense Force general

See also
Giddey, surname

Surnames of African origin